Hans Aslak Guttorm (15 December 1907 – 24 March 1992 in Outakoski, Finland) was a Sámi author who wrote in Northern Sámi. He graduated as a teacher from Jyväskylä's teachers' seminary in 1935 and worked in that profession in Inari and Outakoski until 1969. He also worked for many years as an editor for the Sápmelaš monthly magazine. In 1985, Guttorm was shortlisted for the Nordic Council Literature Prize for his book Golgadeamen; the prize ended up going to Antti Tuuri, however.

Works
 Koccam spalli: tivtak ja maidnasak (1940)
 Golgadeamen (1982)
 Čierru jietna meahcis (1982)
 Radjajohtin (1984)
 Iešnjárgga šiljut (1986)
 Šuvvi jahki (1996) (toim. Inga Guttorm)

External links
 Hans Aslak Guttorm
 Seija Guttorm reciting Guttorm's poem Eatnigiella in Northern Sámi

Finnish Sámi-language writers
Finnish Sámi people
Finnish writers
1907 births
1992 deaths